Renée Passeur (21 October 1905 – 16 January 1975) was a French actress and singer. Extravagant personality of the so-called Tout-Paris, Renée Passeur embodied eccentric characters in films. She was the spouse of author and screenwriter Steve Passeur (1899-1966).

Partial filmography  

1928: Dans l'ombre du harem (by Léon Mathot and André Liabel)
1928: L'Occident (by Henri Fescourt) - Arnaud's fiancée
1929: The Wonderful Day (by René Barberis) - L'inconnue
1930: La nuit est à nous (by Roger Lion) - (uncredited)
1931: Roumanie, terre d'amour (by Camille de Morlhon) - Zanfira
1931: Mon cœur et ses millions (by André Berthomieu) (under the name Modeste Arveyres) - Yolande de Vaneuse
1931: Monsieur cambriole (Short, by Maurice de Canonge)
1931: Diablette (Short, by Lucien Jaquelux)
1932: L'Affaire Blaireau (by Henry Wulschleger) - Mademoiselle de Chaville
1932: Les tutti-frutti (Short, by Jean Gourguet)
1933:  (by Karl Anton)
1934: Surprise partie (Short, by Marc Didier)
1934: Six trente cinq (Short, by Pierre de Rameroy)
1940: Face au destin (by Henri Fescourt) 
1951: Une histoire d'amour (by Guy Lefranc) - Léa
1953: Carnaval (by Henri Verneuil) - an aunt
1953: Le Guérisseur (by Yves Ciampi) - the countess
1954: Les Intrigantes (by Henri Decoin) - Mme Marcange, the author's wife
1955: Papa, maman, ma femme et moi (by Jean-Paul Le Chanois) - la visiteuse snob
1955: L'impossible Monsieur Pipelet (by André Hunebelle) - Mme Richet, the landlord's wife
1955:  (by Jean Delannoy) - Francis's grandmother
1956: Maid in Paris (by Pierre Gaspard-Huit) - the woman with the gigolo
1956: Les carottes sont cuites (by Robert Vernay)
1957: La Garçonne (by Jacqueline Audry) - Mme Sorbier
1958: Rafles sur la ville (by Pierre Chenal) - the gamer
1958: Le Miroir à deux faces (by André Cayatte) - Carine, a patient of doctor Bosc
1959: Oh ! Qué mambo (by John Berry) - lady Gobert, a student of the fitness teacher on the beach
1959: Les Liaisons dangereuses (by Roger Vadim) - a guest of the Valmont (uncredited)
1961: Captain Fracasse (by Pierre Gaspard-Huit) - Dame Léonarde, the duenna of the troop
1963: Strip-tease (by Jacques Poitrenaud) - the rich woman
1964: Circle of Love (by Roger Vadim) - the neighbour
1964: Male Companion (by Philippe de Broca) - the boss
1965: La Métamorphose des cloportes (by Pierre Granier-Deferre) - a friend of Léone

Theatre 
 1951: La Reine Mère ou Les Valois terribles Opéra-bouffe by Pierre Devaux, music by Georges Van Parys, directed by Michel de Ré, Théâtre du Quartier latin
 1952: N'écoutez pas, mesdames ! by Sacha Guitry, directed by the author, Théâtre des Variétés

External links 
 
 19 films liés à Renée Passeur on Ciné-Ressources.net

1905 births
1975 deaths
French film actresses
French silent film actresses
20th-century French actresses
Actresses from Paris